Allexis is a genus of plants in the family Violaceae.

Species include:

 Allexis cauliflora (Oliver) Pierre
 Allexis obanensis (Baker f.) Melch.

References 

Violaceae
Malpighiales genera
Taxonomy articles created by Polbot
Taxa named by Jean Baptiste Louis Pierre